João Pedro Gonçalves Neves (born 27 September 2004) is a Portuguese professional footballer who plays as a midfielder for Benfica.

Club career
Neves signed his first professional contract with Benfica in December 2020.

International career
He has represented Portugal at youth international level.

Career statistics

Club

Notes

Honours
Benfica
Campeonato Nacional de Juniores: 2021–22
UEFA Youth League: 2021–22
Under-20 Intercontinental Cup: 2022

References

External links
 Profile at the S.L. Benfica website

2004 births
Living people
People from Tavira
Portuguese footballers
Portugal youth international footballers
Association football midfielders
Liga Portugal 2 players
Primeira Liga players
S.L. Benfica B players
S.L. Benfica footballers